Pseudopediasia is a genus of moths of the family Crambidae.

Species
Pseudopediasia amathusia Bleszynski, 1963
Pseudopediasia calamellus (Hampson, 1919)
Pseudopediasia diana Bleszynski, 1963

References

Crambini
Crambidae genera
Taxa named by Stanisław Błeszyński